Biological Theory is a peer-reviewed scientific journal covering the fields of evolution and cognition, including cognitive psychology, epistemology, philosophy of science, philosophy of biology, evolutionary biology, and developmental biology. It was established in 2005 and originally published by MIT Press, sponsored by the Konrad Lorenz Institute for Evolution and Cognition Research (KLI). As of January 1, 2012, the publisher is Springer Science+Business Media. The first editor-in-chief was Werner Callebaut of the KLI and the University of Vienna). The current editor-in-chief is Stuart A. Newman of New York Medical College.

Abstracting and indexing 
The journal is abstracted and indexed in BIOSIS Previews, Biological Abstracts, and The Zoological Record.

References

External links

 

Biology journals
Springer Science+Business Media academic journals
Quarterly journals
Publications established in 2005
English-language journals